El rey del tomate ("The Tomato King") is a 1964 Mexican comedy-drama film, directed by Miguel M. Delgado and starring Eulalio González, Luz Márquez, and Emma Roldán. With Lupe Carriles and María Elena Velasco performing in uncredited roles.

Cast
Eulalio González	 ...	Librado Cantu Escamilla (as Lalo Gonzalez Piporro)
Luz Márquez	 ...	Silvia
Emma Roldán	 ...	Tía Mila
Alfredo Wally Barrón	 ...	El Toro - bandido (as Alfredo Walli Barrón)
José Jasso	 ...	Chema
Antonio Bravo	 ...	Don Cosme
Lucila González	 ...	Domitila
José Chávez	 ...	Bandido
Luis Lomeli	 ...	Enrique	
Antonio Haro Oliva		
Julián de Meriche	 ...	Cantinero
Carlos Guarneros	 ...	Cantante (as Carlos Guarneros 'Cuco')
Rest of cast listed alphabetically
Lupe Carriles	 ...	Esposa de Chema (uncredited)
Arturo Castro 'Bigotón'	 ...	Ranchero (uncredited)
María Elena Velasco	 ...	Clienta de Librado (uncredited)

External links

Mexican comedy-drama films
1964 films
Films directed by Miguel M. Delgado
1960s Mexican films